Deen Channel, previously known as Deen TV,  is a lifestyle TV channel based in South Africa which has an Islamic ethos broadcasting to a wide range of audience interest. The channels content covers a wide range of Genres including, health, education, environmental, community and travel amongst others.

Deen Channel is a privately owned TV channel, owned by Deen Media Holdings (Pty). Ltd which was started in 2011 and officially launched in June 2012 initially on Top TV or StarSat as channel 365 on the satellite broadcaster.  In mid October 2013. Deen Channel broadcasts into more than 50 countries in Africa on Star Times.

The Channel is managed by a Board of Directors of which Faizal Sayed who is also a TV Talk Show Host, was the Chief Executive Officer until he stepped down as Chief Executive in September 2019 following the passing of his mother.

Programs and series 
Popular programs and Series seen on Deen TV
From The Clubhouse
Be Driven
The Sunni Path
The Faizal Sayed Show
The Friday Sermon
Medical Matters
Little Explorers
Haram Live

See also 
 List of South African television channels
 Television in South Africa
 TopTV
 StarSat

References 
 Deen TV Overhauled Article by The Voice of the Cape.
 Muslim Directory of South Africa Listed as Media House.
 Top TV ban wrong VOC (April 2013).
 Deen TV on HD Voice of the Cape Radio article (19 October 2013)
 Deen TV expands Signal Distribution PRLog Press ( 18 September 2013)
 EIRP Values for South Africa Lyngsat.
 Deen TV launches on Top TV Lenzinfo (13 June 2013)
 Top TV release (June 2012).

External links 
 The Deen Channel News Website
  Official Facebook Fan Page

Television stations in South Africa